This is a list of flag bearers who have represented Barbados at the Olympics.

Flag bearers carry the national flag of their country at the opening ceremony of the Olympic Games.

See also
Barbados at the Olympics

References

Barbados at the Olympics
Barbados
Olympic